This list of bridges in Croatia lists bridges of particular historical, scenic, architectural or engineering interest. Road and railway bridges, viaducts, aqueducts and footbridges are included.

Historical and architectural interest bridges

Major road and railway bridges 
This table presents the structures with spans greater than 100 meters (non-exhaustive list).

Notes and references 
 Notes

 

 Others references

See also 

 Transport in Croatia
 Highways in Croatia
 Rail transport in Croatia
 Geography of Croatia

External links

Further reading 
 
 
 
 
 
 

Croatia
 
Bridges
Bridges